Guy Anson Maunsell (1 September 1884 – 20 June 1961) was the British civil engineer responsible for the design of the World War II Naval sea forts and Army forts used by the United Kingdom for the defence of the Thames and Mersey estuaries.

Early life
Maunsell was born in 1884 in Srinagar, Kashmir in British India, one of three children of a military family. His father, Edward Henry Maunsell (1837–1913) was of Anglo-Irish descent, and was a captain in the 5th Dragoon Guards and 15th Hussars. His mother, Rosalie Harriet Anson (1852–1922), was born in Guernsey; the couple had married in Bombay Cathedral in 1878. He was distantly related to General Sir Frederick Richard Maunsell (1828–1916) of the Royal Bengal Engineers. Young Guy was sent to school in England at Eastbourne College between 1897 and 1903, and studied civil engineering at the Central Institution of the City & Guilds of London Institute, South Kensington.

Although he graduated with first class honours in 1906, he did not find immediate employment and travelled the country making watercolour paintings. The following year, he became an assistant to Swiss engineer Adrien Palaz (1863–1930), professor of Industrial Electricity at the University of Lausanne, where he learned the latest techniques associated with reinforced concrete. In 1909 he secured a post at Easton Gibb & Son who were engaged in the construction of the Rosyth Dockyard. In July 1914, Maunsell moved to R. Thorburn and Sons as their chief agent and was responsible for building two TNT factories for the British Government.

World War I
In 1917, Maunsell was conscripted as a commissioned officer in the Royal Engineers and spent a year on the Western Front. Recalled to England, he worked as chief engineer at John Ver Mehr's yard in Shoreham, in the construction of concrete tugs and barges called the Shoreham Creteships. He was also involved in the concrete and steel towers for the Admiralty M-N Scheme, which were intended to close the Strait of Dover to U-boats. A single tower survives today as the Nab Tower lighthouse.

In 1955 he founded the firm of G. Maunsell & Partners in the United Kingdom which pioneered the use of pre-stressed concrete in major bridges. The Hammersmith Flyover, completed in 1961, made revolutionary use of this new construction method and many more structures followed. The firm expanded to Australia, Hong Kong and the Middle East and in time merged with Oscar Faber & Partners to form Faber Maunsell, and ultimately became part of the US-based AECOM Group.

Maunsell is best known for his innovative, practical maritime engineering and pioneering the development of prestressed concrete in the UK, Australia and Hong Kong. His view was always that the interests of a client would be best served by an integrated approach to design and construction.

He died at Tunbridge Wells, Kent on 20 June 1961.

References

External links
Pictures of the Sea Forts designed by Maunsell
 Article on the Sea Forts
Maunsell Army Sea Forts
Maunsell Sea Forts
Maunsell | AECOM

1884 births
1961 deaths
Irish civil engineers
Reinforced concrete
British people in colonial India
British expatriates in Switzerland